William Vandyck is an actor, writer and ex-barrister.

Comedy on radio and TV
William Vandyck co-wrote and starred in the BBC Radio 4 series And Now In Colour, which also starred Tim Firth, Tim de Jong and Michael Rutger; one of the Christmas specials of this show won silver medal at the New York Festivals.  He was also the host of the BBC Radio 4 comedy panel series King Stupid, which later became The 99p Challenge, presented by Sue Perkins, and featured in other Radio 4 comedies such as The Intelligence Men and The Legendary Series.  In 2021 his radio sitcom script, "Cole's Law" won Pozzitive Productions' Funnydotcomp. On TV he co-wrote and starred in BBC's It's a Mad World, World, World, World with Alistair McGowan and Caroline Aherne.  He also featured as "Man at Till" in The Return of Mr Bean with Rowan Atkinson, and The Imaginatively Titled Punt and Dennis Show with Steve Punt and Hugh Dennis, and Ripley and Scuff.

Books
William Vandyck is the author of ten children's books, including The Punctuation Repair Kit.  Also, with Tim de Jongh, How to Get Away With Absolutely Anything and How To Do Your Homework in Ten Seconds Flat and, with Tim Scott (who co-starred with him in And Now In Colour as Tim de Jong), The Musketeers Adventure Agency and Tony and Cleo's Interesting Year.

References

External links
It's a Mad World, World, World at IMDB
Vandyck's books at Amazon

British children's writers
British male radio actors
British radio writers
Year of birth missing (living people)
Living people
British barristers